Toghrol Al Jerd Rural District is a rural district (dehestan) in Toghrol Al Jerd District, Kuhbanan County, Kerman Province, Iran. At the 2006 census, its population was 1,200, in 327 families. The rural district has 30 villages.

References 

Rural Districts of Kerman Province
Kuhbanan County